Brauer's main theorems are three theorems in representation theory of finite groups linking the blocks of a finite group (in characteristic p) with those of its p-local subgroups, that is to say, the normalizers of its non-trivial p-subgroups.

The second and third main theorems allow refinements of orthogonality relations for ordinary characters which may be applied in finite group theory. These do not presently admit a proof purely in terms of ordinary characters. 
All three main theorems are stated in terms of the Brauer correspondence.

Brauer correspondence
There are many ways to extend the definition which follows, but this is close to the early treatments 
by Brauer. Let G be a finite group, p be a prime, F be a field of characteristic p.
Let H be a subgroup of G which contains

for some p-subgroup Q
of G, and is contained in the normalizer

,

where  is the centralizer of Q in G.

The Brauer homomorphism (with respect to H) is a linear map from the center of the group algebra of G over F to the corresponding algebra for H. Specifically, it is the restriction to 
kernel is spanned by the elements of G outside . The image of this map is contained in 
, and it transpires that the map is also a ring homomorphism.

Since it is a ring homomorphism, for any block B of FG, the Brauer homomorphism 
sends the identity element of B either to 0 or to an idempotent element. In the latter case, 
the idempotent may be decomposed as a sum of (mutually orthogonal) primitive idempotents of Z(FH). 
Each of these primitive idempotents is the multiplicative identity of some block of FH. The block b of FH is said to be a Brauer correspondent of B if its identity element occurs
in this decomposition of the image of the identity of B under the Brauer homomorphism.

Brauer's first main theorem

defect group D. This bijection arises because when , each block of G
with defect group D has a unique Brauer correspondent block of H, which also has defect 
group D.

Brauer's second main theorem

Brauer's third main theorem

Brauer's third main theorem  states that when Q is a p-subgroup of the finite group G,
then the principal block of H is the only Brauer correspondent of the principal block of G (where the blocks referred to are calculated in characteristic p).

References

 gives a detailed proof of the Brauer's main theorems.

 Walter Feit, The representation theory of finite groups. North-Holland Mathematical Library, 25. North-Holland Publishing Co., Amsterdam-New York, 1982. xiv+502 pp. 

Representation theory of finite groups
Theorems in representation theory